Uspenovka is a rural locality (a settlement) in Bolshepanyushevsky Selsoviet, Aleysky District, Altai Krai, Russia. The population was 10 as of 2013. There are 3 streets.

Geography 
Uspenovka is located on the Aley River, 10 km ENE of Aleysk (the district's administrative centre) by road. Bolshepanyushevo is the nearest rural locality.

References 

Rural localities in Aleysky District